Events from the year 1247 in Ireland.

Incumbent
Lord: Henry III

Events
The earliest known records of a settlement at Carrick-on-Suir are dated to 1247, when a charter of three fairs per year was awarded to Matthew Fitzgriffin, Anglo-Norman Lord of the Manor of Carrick.
Battle between Anglo-Normans and Irish led to the Sack of Dun Gallimhe by Irish forces.

Births

Deaths

References

 
1240s in Ireland
Ireland
Years of the 13th century in Ireland